The historic center of Venice is made up of 121 islands linked by 435 bridges. This list shows the venetian names of the main bridges of Venice by sestiere (district) or island.

Bridges to the city

Bridges over the Canal Grande

Sestieri of Cannaregio

Border Cannaregio-Castello

Sestieri of San Marco

Border San Marco - Castello

Sestieri of Castello

Sestieri of Santa Croce

Border Santa Croce-Dorsoduro

Border Santa Croce-San Polo

Sestieri of San Polo

Border San Polo-Dorsoduro

Sestieri of Dorsoduro

Giudecca

Murano

Burano

Torcello

Lido di Venezia

Sources 
Venise, Guide Vert, Michelin, 
Venezia, CartoGuides, éd. Lannoo
Expert Venetie, Tim Jepson,  
Bridges of Venice, Walking Tours, James Broos, Lulu.com, 2008 - 150 p., 
 Venezia *Ponte per *Ponte "--vita, morte e miracoli-- " dei 443 manufatti che attraversano i canali della città, Gianpietro Zucchetta, 1992, Stamperia di Venezia, Venise.
site reprenant les ponts de Venise
liste de ponts avec caractéristiques

See also
 List of bridges in Italy
 List of bridges in Rome

 
Bridges
Venice
Venice